Ashton-under-Hill railway station was a station on the Midland Railway between Great Malvern and Evesham. It served Ashton under Hill in Worcestershire.

History

Opened by the Midland Railway, it became part of the London, Midland and Scottish Railway during the Grouping of 1923. The station then passed to the London Midland Region of British Railways on nationalisation in 1948. It was then closed by the British Railways Board in 1963.

References

 
 
Geograph

Further reading

External links
Ashton under Hill at Disused stations

Disused railway stations in Worcestershire
Former Midland Railway stations
Railway stations in Great Britain opened in 1864
Railway stations in Great Britain closed in 1963